James Lawless (born 19 August 1976) is an Irish Fianna Fáil politician who has been a Teachta Dála (TD) for the Kildare North constituency since the 2016 general election. He was appointed Chair of the Committee on Justice in September 2020.

He was a member of Kildare County Council from 2014 to 2016. He topped the poll in the 2014 local elections with 2,123 votes. While a member of Kildare County Council, he served as Mayor of Naas prior to his election to Dáil Éireann.

He is a qualified barrister and also has degrees in Mathematics and Computer Science from Trinity College Dublin. He worked as a systems analyst in his early career.

In May 2016, he was appointed by the party leader Micheál Martin as Fianna Fáil Spokesperson on Science, Technology, Research and Development. He was a member of the Energy and Communications Oireachtas Committee, and in February 2017, he was elected as Vice-Chair of that Committee. In February 2018, he was appointed a member of the Business, Enterprise and Innovation Oireachtas committee.

References

External links

James Lawless' page on the Fianna Fáil website

1976 births
Living people
Members of the 32nd Dáil
Members of the 33rd Dáil
Fianna Fáil TDs
Local councillors in County Kildare